Minim may refer to:
 Minim (music), a note length, British English name for a half note (which usually gets two beats)
 MINIM (band), an industrial rock band from Spain
 Minim (unit), a small amount of fluid, essentially a standardized drop
 Minim (religious order), a member of a religious order founded by St. Francis of Paula
 Franciscan Minims of the Perpetual Help of Mary
 Minim (palaeography), a short vertical stroke used in handwriting
 Minim, a Hebrew word denoting "sectarians" (e.g. Sadducees, Nazoraeans, etc.); see Heresy in Judaism
 Minim Inc.
 Minim, Martap, a village in Cameroon
 Minim, in leafcutter ant colonies, member of the caste of smallest-sized workers
 Mini-M, also known as Inmarsat-M, a global satellite internet, telephony and fax network operated by Inmarsat
Minim, French for "little one", was used at the University of Notre Dame from the 1840s to the 1920s to describe students in their grade school department

See also
 Minimum
 Minimi (disambiguation)
 Minime (disambiguation)